NGC 7454 is an elliptical galaxy in the constellation Pegasus. It was discovered on October 15, 1784 by William Herschel. J. L. E. Dreyer described the galaxy as F, cS, lE, lbM, *11 p 1', which indicates it is faint, considerably small, a little extended, with a little brighter middle, and an 11th magnitude star is located 1 arcmin to west.

References

External links 
 

Pegasus (constellation)
7454
Elliptical galaxies